The Worst of Jefferson Airplane is the first compilation album from the rock band Jefferson Airplane, released in November 1970 as RCA Victor LSP-4459. The "Worst" in the title is ironic as the album features all of Jefferson Airplane's hit singles up to that point. It peaked at #12 on the Billboard 200 in 1971 and has since gone platinum.

Content

In 1970, the band underwent a period of inactivity because of internal personnel conflict and pursuit of individual projects.  Drummer Spencer Dryden was ousted from the group, Marty Balin found his commitment to the band he had started becoming tenuous, Grace Slick was pregnant with her daughter for a good part of the year, Paul Kantner released his solo album Blows Against the Empire, and Jorma Kaukonen and Jack Casady busied themselves with their side project, Hot Tuna. With no group project in sight, RCA Records assembled this album centered upon the group's hit singles, with input from the band. "The Ballad of You & Me & Pooneil", "Crown of Creation", and "Volunteers" all made the lower reaches of the Billboard Hot 100. "Somebody to Love" and "White Rabbit" were the band's only Top 40 hits, reaching #5 and #8 respectively. To ensure a full picture of the group's musical interests, and possibly to ensure solidarity in the publishing income, the band included instrumentals by Dryden and Kaukonen, a country blues/gospel cover arranged by Kaukonen, and Balin's straightforward ballad "Today".
This would be the final album featuring what is considered the "classic" line-up of the band, after Slick and Dryden joined, and before Balin and Dryden left.

Original LP copies of the album featured Victor "scroll" labels from the late 1920s. The inner sleeve was a reproduction of a 1918 vintage Victor record sleeve. The interior of the gatefold cover featured a large color reproduction of the painting "His Master's Voice", the famous RCA Victor trademark.    
Later reissues of the LP were housed in a regular, non-gatefold cover and did not include the reproduction of the painting nor the 1918 inner sleeve, but the LP still bore the vintage Victor record labels.

Reissues
On July 29, 1997, RCA reissued a remastered version of Worst on compact disc. On June 6, 2006, RCA reissued the album again, this time with two bonus tracks which had both been released as singles, "Watch Her Ride" and "Greasy Heart".

Track listing
The tracks for side one and side two listed here are those of the original LP. The cassette version features the same songs, but arranged in a different order.

Charts

Personnel

Jefferson Airplane
 Marty Balin – vocals, rhythm guitar
 Grace Slick – vocals, piano, organ, recorder on all tracks except "It's No Secret" and "Blues from an Airplane"
 Paul Kantner – vocals, rhythm guitar
 Jorma Kaukonen – lead guitar, vocals
 Jack Casady – bass
 Spencer Dryden – drums, percussion on all tracks except "It's No Secret" and "Blues from an Airplane"
 Signe Anderson – vocals on "It's No Secret" and "Blues from an Airplane"
 Skip Spence – drums on "It's No Secret" and "Blues from an Airplane"

Additional personnel
 Gary Blackman – nose solo on "Lather"
 Gene Twombly – sound effects on "Lather"
 Nicky Hopkins – piano on "We Can Be Together" and "Volunteers"

Production and recording details
Jefferson Airplane Takes Off released September 1966, recorded on 3-tracks
Surrealistic Pillow released February 1967, recorded on 4-tracks
After Bathing at Baxters released November 1967, recorded on 8-tracks
Crown of Creation released September 1968, recorded on 8-tracks
Bless Its Pointed Little Head released February 1969, recorded live on 8-tracks
Volunteers released November 1969, recorded on 16-tracks
 Alton Kelley, Wes Wilson – album design
 Jefferson Airplane, Bill Thompson, Maurice – album compilation

References

1970 greatest hits albums
Jefferson Airplane compilation albums
RCA Records compilation albums
Albums produced by Marty Balin
Albums produced by Grace Slick
Albums produced by Paul Kantner
Albums produced by Jorma Kraukonen
Albums produced by Jack Casady
Albums produced by Spencer Dryden